Neve Bradbury (born 11 April 2002) is an Australian professional racing cyclist, who currently rides for UCI Women's WorldTeam .

In 2022, Bradbury was studying for a Bachelor of Exercise and Sport Science at Deakin University.

References

External links

2002 births
Living people
Australian female cyclists
Place of birth missing (living people)